Koszczały  is a village in the administrative district of Gmina Dobre, within Radziejów County, Kuyavian-Pomeranian Voivodeship, in north-central Poland.

The village has an approximate population of 50.

References

Villages in Radziejów County